American Caesar: Douglas MacArthur, 1880-1964 is a 1978 biography of General of the Army Douglas MacArthur by American historian William Manchester.

Manchester paints a sympathetic but balanced portrait of MacArthur, praising the general for his military genius, administrative skill, and personal bravery, while criticizing his vanity, paranoia, and tendency toward insubordination.  As the title suggests, Manchester's central thesis is that MacArthur was an analogue of Julius Caesar, a proposition he supports by noting their great intellect, brilliant strategic generalship, political ambition, magnanimity as conquerors, and shared tragic flaw of hubris.

It was made into a series in 1983 hosted by John Huston.

External links
WW2DB: Book review on American Caesar
Foreign Affairs review by Gaddis Smith
 
Commentary Magazine review

1978 non-fiction books
American biographies
Douglas MacArthur
Little, Brown and Company books
Japan in non-Japanese culture